Under the Banner of Heaven is an American true crime drama television miniseries created by Dustin Lance Black based on the nonfiction book of the same name by Jon Krakauer. It premiered on April 28, 2022, on Hulu. Andrew Garfield and Gil Birmingham star as two detectives investigating a brutal murder seemingly connected to Mormonism. The series, while reigniting controversy in the Mormon faith, received highly positive reviews, particularly for Garfield's and Russell's performance.

Premise
The faith of police detective Jeb Pyre is shaken when investigating the murder of a Latter-day Saint mother and her baby daughter that seems to involve the Church of Jesus Christ of Latter-day Saints (LDS Church).

Cast

Main
 Andrew Garfield as Detective Jeb Pyre, a Latter-day Saint detective for the East Rockwell, Utah police department 
 Gil Birmingham as Detective Bill Taba, a Paiute man and non-Latter-day Saint, another detective
 Adelaide Clemens as Rebecca Pyre, Jeb's wife
 Sandra Seacat as Josie Pyre, Jeb's mother who is suffering from dementia

Lafferty Family

 Daisy Edgar-Jones as Brenda Lafferty, Allen's wife
 Billy Howle as Allen Lafferty, Brenda's husband
 Wyatt Russell as Dan Lafferty, Matilda's husband
 Chloe Pirrie as Matilda Lafferty, Dan's wife
 Sam Worthington as Ron Lafferty, Dianna's husband
 Denise Gough as Dianna Lafferty, Ron's wife
 Seth Numrich as Robin Lafferty, based on Mark Lafferty
 Rory Culkin as Samuel Lafferty, based on Watson Lafferty, Jr.
 Christopher Heyerdahl as Ammon Lafferty, Doreen's husband and father to Ron, Dan, Robin, Jacob, Samuel and Allen, based on Watson Lafferty
 Megan Leitch as Doreen Lafferty, Ammon's wife and mother to Ron, Dan, Robin, Jacob, Samuel and Allen
 Taylor St. Pierre as Jacob Lafferty, based on Tim Lafferty

Recurring
 Darren Goldstein as Mr. Wright
 Andrew Burnap as Joseph Smith
 Tyner Rushing as Emma Smith
 Scott Michael Campbell as Brigham Young
 Nicholas Carella as Bernard Brady
 Barclay Hope as Chief Rick Belnap
 Rohan Mead as Officer Morris
 Dean Paul Gibson as Prophet Onias
 Daniel Libman as Stake President Roy Ballard
 Jerod Blake as Desk Cop

Episodes

Production
Initially intended to be adapted as a film beginning in 2011, it was announced in June 2021 that it would now be developed as a miniseries, with Dustin Lance Black retained as screenwriter and David Mackenzie serving as director. Andrew Garfield and Daisy Edgar-Jones were cast to star. The cast was rounded out in August, with Sam Worthington, Wyatt Russell, Denise Gough, Rory Culkin, and Gil Birmingham among the new additions.

Lindsay Hansen Park worked as a consultant.

Filming in Alberta began in August 2021 and was completed in December 2021.

Release
The series premiered on April 28, 2022, on FX on Hulu. It is also set to premiere on Disney+ (Star) in international markets and Star+ In Latin America soon after. The series made its linear premiere on the FX channel on March 7, 2023.

Reception

Audience viewership 
According to the streaming aggregator Reelgood, Under the Banner of Heaven was the 7th most streamed program across all platforms, during the week of May 4, 2022, the 8th most streamed program during the week of May 11, 2022, the 5th most streamed television series during the week of May 14, 2022, and the 9th during the week of May 21, 2022.

Critical response 
The review aggregator website Rotten Tomatoes reported as 86% approval rating with an average rating of 7.40/10, based on 49 critic reviews. The website's critics consensus reads, "While Under the Banner of Heaven gets bogged down by an overabundance of backstory, its procedural through-line is enriched by thoughtfully grappling with personal faith." Metacritic, which uses a weighted average, assigned a score of 71 out of 100 based on 25 critics, indicating "generally favorable reviews".

Patrick Q. Mason, in a review of the show, pointed out that it is the most recent entry in a long history of American media portrayals of Mormons as inherently violent. McKay Coppins, a Mormon journalist, stated in an article in The Atlantic that the series demonizes Mormons and misrepresents the faith. He said that "no one involved in the show felt compelled to check the customary boxes Hollywood creators have been trained to check in this era of inclusiveness and representation. Black did not hire any practicing Mormons to write or consult on the show." Lindsay Hansen Park later replied, "I guess Deseret News had printed something where they said they had asked FX if there were faithful members involved and they said no. I don't even know why they printed that, that must be misinformation, because we did tell them yes, that there were, cause there were! We had bishops, we had Relief Society Presidents, we had a good number of faithful people that we consulted. [...] I've named a few of the people who I think are okay with me naming them on my Facebook, some scholars who helped. But there are — for this reason — people that don't want their name to be involved."

Former American Fork Police Chief Randy Johnson said "I find the book to be substantially more accurate than the miniseries. ... I cannot recognize any actual person that I knew or came to know, accurately depicted in the series. The series does not reflect the actual investigation that I oversaw. Nor does it reflect the attitudes, behaviors and conduct of me or any of my officers. It is clearly a work of fiction as indicated by the disclaimer.” Sharon Wright Weeks, Brenda's sister, likewise said that, "I do not recognize her [Brenda] at all in any of the show."

Accolades

References

External links
Under the Banner of Heaven at FX
Under the Banner of Heaven at Hulu

2022 American television series debuts
2022 American television series endings
2020s American crime drama television series
2020s American drama television miniseries
2020s American police procedural television series
Cultural depictions of Joseph Smith
English-language television shows
FX on Hulu original programming
Mormonism in fiction
Television series by Imagine Entertainment
Television shows based on non-fiction books
Television shows filmed in Calgary
Television shows set in Utah
True crime television series
Mormon cinema